The Damascus Declaration was a statement of unity by Syrian opposition figures issued in October 2005. It criticized the Syrian government of the Assad dynasty as "authoritarian, totalitarian and cliquish," and called for "peaceful, gradual," reform "founded on accord, and based on dialogue and recognition of the other."

The five-page document was signed by more than 250 major opposition figures as well as parties "both secular and religious, Arab and Kurdish." It was considered important that the statement included the Muslim Brotherhood group of Syria, in addition to secular groups.
 The statement called for a "fair solution for the Kurdish issue in Syria in a way insures the equality of Kurds with all other Syrian citizens".

Syrian journalist and activist Michel Kilo launched the declaration, after the Syrian writer and thinker Abdulrazak Eid had written its first draft. Riad Seif, another democracy activist, was the first signatory.  The "five small opposition groups" signing the declaration were the Arab nationalist National Democratic Rally, the Kurdish Democratic Alliance, the Committees of Civil Society, the Kurdish Democratic Front and the Movement of the Future.

Twelve members of the Damascus Declaration National Council were sentenced to two and a half years in prison in October 2008.  According to a leaked March 2009 diplomatic cable, Syrian President Bashar al-Assad responded to a comment by U.S. Senator Cardin that he could give "specific examples of citizens jailed for their political views" by saying that "we are a country in process of reform.  We aren't perfect.  You are talking about 
12 people out of 20 million.  It's a process. We are moving forward, not fast, but methodically."  He said that the members had been convicted for their "contact with an individual in Lebanon who had invited the U.S. to attack Syria.  This is against our law."  In response to Senator Cardin's suggestion that Syria adhere to international standards, Asad chuckled in reply "You do not see this (international standards) anywhere in the region," comparing the situation of half a million Palestinian refugees in Syria and saying that "if he were working against his people, he would not enjoy such popularity."

Member groups
Syrian Democratic People's Party
Movement for Justice and Development in Syria
National Liberal Alliance
Arab Socialist Movement
Arab Revolutionary Workers Party

Former member groups
Muslim Brotherhood of Syria
Democratic Socialist Arab Ba'ath Party
Assyrian Democratic Organization
Kurdish Democratic Party in Syria (el-Partî)
Kurdish Democratic Progressive Party
Kurdish Democratic Unity Party in Syria
Democratic Union Party
Kurdish Democratic Equality Party in Syria

See also
 Politics of Syria

References

External links
Damascus Declaration (eng)

2005 documents
Political activism
2005 in Syria
Human rights in Syria
Defunct political party alliances in Syria
Syrian opposition